Campfire is the twelfth studio album by Australian recording artist James Blundell, released in February 2017. The album peaked at number 58 on the ARIA Albums Chart, becoming Blundell's first album to make the top 100 since Earth & Sea in 1995.

Background
In mid 2016, Blundell started the recording Campfire, following a conversation with collaborator and Red Rebel Music head Karen Waters about Bruce Springsteen's album Nebraska; an album recorded at home and on the cheap. Blundell told Canberra Times "She said to me, "How would you like to forget about the writing and do something just for the joy of singing?" And that sounded wonderful." With that in mind, Blundell and Waters unearthed songs with great stories and telling them the way you would around a campfire, with a beer and great friends.

Track listing

Charts

Release history

References

2017 albums
James Blundell (singer) albums
Covers albums